Andrew Paul Campbell (born 18 April 1979) is an English football manager and former player who is currently manager of Middlesbrough Women. 

Campbell played as a striker, notably for Middlesbrough, Cardiff City and Dunfermline Athletic. After retiring in 2012, he began a career in management, becoming manager of Norton & Stockton Ancients.

Playing Career

Middlesbrough
Born in Middlesbrough, Campbell started his career with his hometown team Middlesbrough, making his debut on 5 April 1996, coming on as a substitute in a 3-1 win over Sheffield Wednesday. He scored his first goal for the club on 13 January 1998, in a 2–0 win against Queens Park Rangers in the FA Cup third-round replay. After loan spells with Sheffield United and Bolton Wanderers, he scored against Manchester United in the FA Cup fourth-round, in a 2–0 win for Middlesbrough on 26 January 2002. After spending the rest of the season on loan at Cardiff City, the deal was made permanent for a reported £1 million.

Cardiff City
His Cardiff career got off to an explosive start, scoring 6 times in his first 4 appearances. He scored once on his debut against Northampton Town, twice on his third appearance against Blackpool and a hat-trick in his fourth appearance against Oldham Athletic. Overall, he had two fairly productive years at the beginning of his spell at Ninian Park, including a fine lob over goalkeeper Chris Day at the Millennium Stadium to give Cardiff a play-off victory over Queens Park Rangers to put them into the Football League Championship. However, he struggled in his remaining years and after loan spells with Doncaster Rovers and Oxford United, he joined Scottish Premier League club Dunfermline Athletic, making his debut on 28 January 2006, in a 1–1 draw against Motherwell.

Later career
Campbell signed for Halifax Town on a free transfer on 8 August 2006, although his season was interrupted by a serious knee injury. He made a good start to the following season, netting a brace against Altrincham in the second game of the season, and then a hat-trick against Droylsden later in the month.

He left Halifax after the club folded at the end of the 2007–08 season. In July 2008, he joined Farsley Celtic on trial. After scoring some good goals in pre-season, he was signed on a permanent deal. Six months later, he left Farsley to join another West Yorkshire side Bradford Park Avenue. He scored in his first start with Avenue as they defeated Marine 4–0.

He subsequently joined Whitby Town.

International career
Campbell made his England under-21 debut on 29 March 2000, scoring the opening goal in a 3-0 win over Yugoslavia, securing qualification to the 2000 UEFA European Under-21 Championship.  He made two appearances during the group stage of the tournament, first against Turkey, scoring the last goal of a 6-0 win, and against Slovakia.

He made his last appearance for the under-21’s during a friendly against Georgia at the Riverside Stadium.

Managerial career
In June 2012 Campbell was appointed manager of Norton & Stockton Ancients.
In June 2015 he was appointed manager of West Auckland Town. In August 2021 he was appointed manager of Middlesbrough Women.

Honours

Player
Middlesbrough
Football League Division One runner-up: 1997–98

Cardiff City
Football League Division Two play-offs: 2002–03

Manager
Norton & Stockton Ancients
Northern League Division Two promotion: 2014–15
Ernest Armstrong Cup: 2014–15

References

External links

1979 births
Living people
English footballers
Footballers from Middlesbrough
Association football forwards
Middlesbrough F.C. players
Sheffield United F.C. players
Bolton Wanderers F.C. players
Cardiff City F.C. players
Doncaster Rovers F.C. players
Oxford United F.C. players
Dunfermline Athletic F.C. players
Halifax Town A.F.C. players
Farsley Celtic A.F.C. players
Bradford (Park Avenue) A.F.C. players
Whitby Town F.C. players
Premier League players
Scottish Premier League players
English Football League players
National League (English football) players
Northern Premier League players
England under-21 international footballers
England youth international footballers